TVF 50th Anniversary Sport Hall, is a volleyball and indoor beach volley hall situated within the Burhan Felek Sports Complex in the Altunizade neighborhood of Üsküdar district in Istanbul, Turkey. It was re-opened on October 11, 2008. It is owned by the municipality of Kadıköy District and operated by the Directorate of Youth and Sport of Istanbul Province.

The sports hall was built by the Turkish Volleyball Federation (TVF) as an annex to the Burhan Felek Arena replacing two tennis courts. The former volleyball hall was abondened.

The arena with an audience capacity of 7,500 hosts national and international volleyball and indoor beach volley events.

The men's volleyball team of İstanbul Büyükşehir Belediyesi plays its league matches in TVF 50th Anniversary Sport Hall.

International events hosted
 2012–13 CEV Women's Champions League-Final Four

References

Sports venues in Istanbul
Volleyball venues in Turkey
Indoor arenas in Turkey
Üsküdar
Sports venues completed in 2008